The Blue River is a small river in the South Island of New Zealand. It flows its entire length within the Mount Aspiring National Park, and although on the southeastern side of the main divide, the river is within the boundaries of the West Coast region for its entire length.

The headwaters are southeast of the main range of the Southern Alps near the mountain Eyetooth, with the smaller Blue River North Branch and South Branch joining the main Blue River later.  Shortly before flowing into the Makarora River, the river passes through a narrow gorge.

The longer Blue Valley tramping track leads deep into the Blue River Valley and along most of the length of the river.

References

Westland District
Rivers of the West Coast, New Zealand
Rivers of New Zealand